Zorro David (1923 Orani, Bataan -2008 Schaumburg, Illinois) was a Philippines-born American actor, best known for his role as Anacleto in the 1967 Reflections in a Golden Eye (film). His camp portrayal has in later years earned interest from Philippine studies and queer studies scholars. Previously, he had achieved success as a celebrity hairstylist and in later life he became known as an abstract expressionist painter.

References

1923 births
2008 deaths
American male actors of Filipino descent
American hairdressers
American painters